The Noman’s Land Range was a former naval bomb range for aviators, located on Nomans Land, in Chilmark, Massachusetts.

History
An airfield was constructed by the U.S. Navy on the southern edge of the island between November 1942 and May 1944, and the island was used, beginning in World War II, as Nomans Land Range for 53 years, 1943-1996.  The airfield was abandoned by the U.S. Navy sometime between 1945 and 1954.

In 1952 the island was sold by the Crane family to the Navy.

The eastern third of the island has been managed by the Fish and Wildlife Service (FWS) since 1975.  Following an effort to clear the island of ordnance in 1997 and 1998, the rest of the island was transferred to the FWS for use as a wildlife refuge, primarily for migratory birds. It now forms Nomans Land Island National Wildlife Refuge.

Two restricted airspace areas, R-4105A and R-4105B, overlaid the island due to the site's former use as a range. These restricted areas were revoked in October 2014.

See also
 List of military installations in Massachusetts

References

External links
Nomans Land Island National Wildlife Refuge at the U.S. Fish & Wildlife Service site
Annals of Chilmark, "Nomans Land". From The History of Martha's Vineyard, Volume II by Dr. Charles E. Banks. 1911.

Installations of the United States Navy in Massachusetts
Military installations closed in the 1990s
Bombing ranges
Buildings and structures in Dukes County, Massachusetts
Martha's Vineyard
Closed installations of the United States Navy